Curtiss Aeroplane and Motor Company (1909 – 1929) was an American aircraft manufacturer originally founded by Glenn Hammond Curtiss and Augustus Moore Herring in Hammondsport, New York. After significant commercial success in its first decades, it merged with the Wright Aeronautical to form Curtiss-Wright Corporation.

History

Origin 
In 1907, Glenn Curtiss was recruited by the scientist Dr. Alexander Graham Bell as a founding member of Bell's Aerial Experiment Association (AEA), with the intent of establishing an aeronautical research and development organization. According to Bell, it was a "co-operative scientific association, not for gain but for the love of the art and doing what we can to help one another."

In 1909, shortly before the AEA was disbanded, Curtiss partnered with Augustus Moore Herring to form the Herring-Curtiss Company. It was renamed the Curtiss Aeroplane Company in 1910 and reorganized in 1912 after being taken-over by the Curtiss Motor Company.

Curtiss Aeroplane and Motor Company

The Curtiss Aeroplane and Motor Company was created on January 13, 1916, from the Curtiss Aeroplane Company of Hammondsport, New York, and Curtiss Motor Company of Bath, New York. Burgess Company of Marblehead, Massachusetts, became a subsidiary in February 1916. At the same time, the Curtiss Engineering Company was established as a subsidiary in Garden City, New York.

With the onset of World War I, military orders rose sharply, and Curtiss needed to expand quickly. In 1916, the company moved its headquarters and most manufacturing activities to Buffalo, New York, where there was far greater access to transportation, manpower, manufacturing expertise, and much needed capital. The company housed an aircraft engine factory in the former Taylor Signal Company-General Railway Signal Company. An ancillary operation was begun in Toronto, Ontario, that was involved in both production and training, setting up the first flying school in Canada in 1915.

In 1917, the two major aircraft patent holders, the Wright Company and the Curtiss Company, had effectively blocked the building of new airplanes, which were desperately needed as the United States was entering World War I. The U.S. government, as a result of a recommendation of a committee formed by Franklin D. Roosevelt, then Assistant Secretary of the Navy, pressured the industry to form a cross-licensing organization (in other terms a Patent pool), the Manufacturer's Aircraft Association. Later that year, Curtiss was acquired by the automobile manufacturer Willys-Overland.

Curtiss was instrumental in the development of U.S. Naval Aviation by providing training for pilots and providing aircraft. The first major order was for 144 various subtypes of the Model F trainer flying boat. In 1914, Curtiss had lured B. Douglas Thomas from Sopwith to design the Model J trainer, which led to the JN-4 two-seat biplane trainer (known affectionately as the "Jenny").

The Curtiss Aeroplane and Motor Company worked with the United States' British and Canadian allies, resulting in JN-4 (Can) trainers (nicknamed the "Canuck") being built in Canada. In order to complete large military orders, JN-4 production was distributed to five other manufacturers. After the war, large numbers of JN-4s were sold as surplus, making influential as the first plane for many interwar pilots, including Amelia Earhart. A stamp was printed to commemorate the Curtiss JN-4, however a printing error resulted in some having the aircraft image inverted, which has become very valuable, and one of the best known rare stamps, even being featured in a number of movies.

The Curtiss HS-2L flying boat was used extensively in the war for anti-submarine patrols and was operated from bases in Nova Scotia, France, and Portugal. The John Cyril Porte of the Royal Navy and Curtiss worked together to improve the design of the Curtiss flying boats resulting in the Curtiss F5L and the similar Felixstowe F.3. Curtiss also worked with the United States Navy to develop the NC-4, which became the first aircraft to fly across the Atlantic Ocean in 1919, making several stops en route. By the end of World War I, the Curtiss Aeroplane and Motor Company would claim to be the largest aircraft manufacturer in the world, employing 18,000 in Buffalo and 3,000 in Hammondsport, New York. Curtiss produced 10,000 aircraft during that war, and more than 100 in a single week.

Peace brought cancellation of wartime contracts. In September 1920, the Curtiss Aeroplane and Motor Company underwent a financial reorganization and Glenn Curtiss cashed out his stock in the company for $32 million and retired to Florida. He continued as a director of the company but served only as an advisor on design. Clement M. Keys gained control of the company from Willys-Overland and it later became the nucleus of a large group of aviation companies.

Curtiss seaplanes won the Schneider Cup in two consecutive races, those of 1923 and 1925.

The Curtiss Robin light transport was first flown in 1928, becoming one of the company's biggest sellers during the Great Depression, and the 769 built helped keep the company solvent when orders for military aircraft were hard to find.

Curtiss-Wright Corporation
On July 5, 1929, Curtiss Aeroplane and Motor Company together with 11 other Wright and Curtiss affiliated companies merged to become the Curtiss-Wright Corporation. One of the last projects started by Curtiss Aeroplane was the ambitious Curtiss-Bleecker SX-5-1 Helicopter, a design that had propellers located midpoint on each of the four large rotors that drove the main rotors. This design, while costly and well engineered, was ultimately a failure.

Curtiss Aviation School
Curtiss also operated a flying school at Long Branch Aerodrome in Toronto Township, Ontario, from 1915 to 1917 before being taken over by the Royal Flying Corps Canada.

Atlantic Coast Aeronautical Station
Glenn H. Curtiss sponsored the Atlantic Coast Aeronautical Station on a 20-acre tract east of the Newport News boat harbor in the Fall of 1915 with Captain Thomas Scott Baldwin as head. Many civilian students, including Canadians, later became famed World War I flyers. Victor Carlstrom, Vernon Castle, Eddie Stinson and General Billy Mitchell trained here. The school was disbanded in 1922.

Products

Aircraft

Aircraft engines 

 Curtiss A-2 (engine)
 Curtiss OX-5
 Curtiss OXX
 Curtiss C-6
 Curtiss D-12 (Curtiss V-1150)
 Curtiss K-12
 Curtiss V-2
 Curtiss V-1570 Conqueror    
 Curtiss H-1640 Chieftain    
 Curtiss R-600 Challenger
 Curtiss R-1454

Helicopters 
 Curtiss-Bleecker SX-5-1 Helicopter

See also
 Alfred V. Verville

References

Footnotes

Notes

Bibliography
 Bell, Dana, ed. Directory of Airplanes, their Designers and Manufacturers. Washington, D.C.: Smithsonian Institution, 2002. .
 Bowers, Peter M. Curtiss Aircraft 1907–1947. London: Putnam & Company Ltd., 1979. .
 Casey, Louis S. Curtiss, The Hammondsport Era, 1907–1915. New York: Crown Publishers, 1981. .
 Gunston, Bill. World Encyclopedia of Aircraft Manufacturers. Annapolis, Maryland: Naval Institute Press, 1993. .
 Mondey, David, ed., revised and updated by Michael Taylor. The New Illustrated Encyclopedia of Aircraft. London: Greenwich Editions, 2000. .
 Milberry, Larry. Aviation in Canada. Toronto, Ontario, Canada: McGraw-Hill Ryerson, 1979. .
 Milberry, Larry. Aviation in Canada: The Pioneer Decades, Vol. 1. Toronto, Ontario, Canada: CANAV Books, 2008. .
 Molson, Ken M. and Harold A. Taylor. Canadian Aircraft Since 1909. Stittsville, Ontario: Canada's Wings, Inc., 1982. .
 Sobel, Robert. The Age of Giant Corporations: A Microeconomic History of American Business, 1914–1970.  Westport, Connecticut: Greenwood Press, 1972. .
 Roseberry, C.R. Glenn Curtiss: Pioneer of Flight. Garden City, New York: Doubleday & Company, 1972. .
 Studer, Clara. Sky Storming Yankee: The Life of Glenn Curtiss. New York: Stackpole Sons, 1937.

External links

 The Curtiss Company: U.S. Centennial of Flight Commemoration
 History of the Aerospace Industry in Buffalo, NY

Defunct aircraft manufacturers of the United States
History of Buffalo, New York
Curtiss-Wright Company
Vehicle manufacturing companies established in 1916
Vehicle manufacturing companies disestablished in 1929
Manufacturing companies based in Buffalo, New York
Defunct companies based in New York (state)
Defunct aircraft engine manufacturers of the United States
Defunct helicopter manufacturers of the United States